Liquid Entertainment was an American independent video game developer based in Pasadena, California. The studio was founded in April 1999 by Ed Del Castillo and Mike Grayford.

History 
Liquid Entertainment was founded in April 1999 by Ed Del Castillo and Mike Grayford.

Liquid's first game was Battle Realms, published by Crave Entertainment in November 2001 to critical acclaim. Battle Realms is a real-time strategy PC game for Windows that features an unconventional approach to resource management and unit development. It was well received by reviewers, many of whom praised its at-the-time state of the art 3D engine and East Asian-inspired setting and aesthetics but sale numbers were disappointing. It was also chosen for Computer Gaming World's Top 10 Games of E3 2001. Battle Realms was followed up with a stand-alone expansion pack, Battle Realms: Winter of the Wolf in April 2002. Winter of the Wolf was received with enthusiasm by the Battle Realms by the gaming community; some reviewers compared it favorably to 2002's blockbuster real-time strategy titles Warcraft III and Age of Mythology.

Since the release of Winter of the Wolf, Liquid has developed two real-time strategy PC games based on intellectual property licenses: In November 2003, Sierra released The Lord of the Rings: War of the Ring, based on Vivendi Universal's license to Tolkien's literary works, and in October 2005 Atari published the Dungeons & Dragons PC game Dragonshard. Dragonshard has since been re-released on GOG.com.

In October 2006, Buena Vista Games released Desperate Housewives: The Game, a life simulation computer game adaptation of the popular television series Desperate Housewives. Desperate Housewives: The Game won PC Gamer Adventure Game of the Year for 2007.

Liquid's next game Rise of the Argonauts, released in December 2008 and published by Codemasters, is a Greek mythology-themed action role-playing game for Windows, PlayStation 3 and Xbox 360 that was well received for its technical merits, art direction and gameplay. In 2011 Sega published Liquid's second console game for Xbox 360 and PS3 Thor: God of Thunder that coincided with Marvel Studios's release of the film Thor in May 2011.

In 2012 Liquid pivoted into developing casual games for Facebook. They did some contract work on InstantJam, a music rhythm game for Facebook, Deadline Hollywood: Game based on the popular Hollywood news blog Deadline Hollywood by Nikki Finke and Paramount Digital Entertainment for Facebook and iOS and Dungeons and Dragons: Heroes of Neverwinter, a turn-based strategy game published by Atari on Facebook.

Later in 2013 and 2014 they continued their pivot into mobile games with titles like Karateka (console and mobile), Cuddle Pets, Paper Galaxy, and Max Steel. By the end of 2014, Ed decided to downsize Liquid to its current position as a holding company and consultancy; selling off some of its holdings, licensing some of its technology, and keep the rest for future opportunities.

Liquid currently manages a number of properties that are available online and published Battle Realms:Zen Edition as Early Access on Steam.

Games developed 
 Battle Realms (2001), published by Crave Entertainment and Ubisoft
 2002 nomination in "PC Strategy" category for The Academy of Interactive Arts & Sciences (AIAS) awards
 Battle Realms: Winter of the Wolf (2002), published by Crave Entertainment and Ubisoft
 The Lord of the Rings: War of the Ring (2003), published by Sierra Entertainment
 Dungeons & Dragons: Dragonshard (2005), published by Atari
 Desperate Housewives: The Game (2006), published by Buena Vista Games
 2007 nomination in "Outstanding Achievement in Character Performance – Female" category for the AIAS awards
 Rise of the Argonauts (2008), published by Codemasters
 Thor: God of Thunder (2011), published by Sega
Instant Jam: Facebook (2012), published by GarageGames
 Deadline Hollywood: The Game (2012), published by Paramount Digital Entertainment
 Dungeons and Dragons: Heroes of Neverwinter (2012), published by Atari
 Paper Galaxy (2012), published by Liquid Entertainment, LLC
Karateka (2013), published by Karateka, LLC
Cuddle Pets (2013), published by Digital Capital
Max Steel (2014), published by Mattel

References

External links 
Liquid Entertainment's website
Liquid Entertainment on MobyGames
Liquid Entertainment on GiantBomb

American companies established in 1999
American companies disestablished in 2018
Defunct video game companies of the United States
Video game companies established in 1999
Video game companies disestablished in 2018
Video game development companies
Companies based in Pasadena, California
1999 establishments in California
2018 disestablishments in California
Defunct companies based in Greater Los Angeles